"Dark Clouds" is a song by Space, released as their fifth and final single from their debut album Spiders (1996). The song peaked at #14 on the UK singles chart in February 1997.

Track listing

 CD1 CDGUT6
"Dark Clouds (Radio Edit)"
"Dark Clouds (Alternative Version)"
"Storm Clouds"
"Darker Clouds"

CD2 CXGUT6
"Dark Clouds (Radio Edit)" - 3:32
"Children Of The Night" – 4:22
"Influenza" – 4:17
"Had Enough" – 6:18

Cassette CAGUT6
"Dark Clouds (Radio Edit)" - 3:32
"Children Of The Night" – 4:22
"Influenza" – 4:17

Charts

References

External links
"Dark Clouds" article

Space (English band) songs
1996 songs
1997 singles
Songs about depression